The 2009 Northern Iowa Panthers football team represented the University of Northern Iowa in the 2009 NCAA Division I FCS football season. The previous year's team finished tied for first (of nine) in the Missouri Valley Football Conference (MVC). The team was coached by Mark Farley and played their home games in the UNI-Dome. The team finished with a record of 7–4 (5–3 MVC).

Schedule

Personnel

Coaching staff

Rankings

Postseason honors
Defensive end Jason Ruffin was selected to the East–West Shrine Bowl.

References

Northern Iowa
Northern Iowa Panthers football seasons
Northern Iowa Panthers football